"Baby Universal" is a song by Tin Machine, released as the second single from their Tin Machine II album in October 1991.

Background and recording
David Bowie and Reeves Gabrels originally recorded a demo of "Baby Universal" in 1988, prior to the actual formation of the band Tin Machine, but it was shelved for the first album after producer Tim Palmer suggested it might be "too catchy" for the first album.

The single release was backed with tracks recorded at the band's BBC session recorded for Mark Goodier's radio show on 13 August 1991, and a live appearance on the BBC's Top of the Pops.

Bowie re-recorded "Baby Universal" in 1996 for his 1997 album Earthling, but it was not released on the album, instead eventually being released in 2020 as part of the EP Is it Any Wonder?.

Track listing
7" version
 "Baby Universal" (David Bowie, Reeves Gabrels) – 3:07
 "You Belong in Rock 'n' Roll" (Extended version) (Bowie, Gabrels) – 6:32

12" version
 "Baby Universal" (Extended version) (Bowie, Gabrels) – 5:49
 "A Big Hurt (BBC version)" (Bowie) – 3:33
 "Baby Universal" (BBC version) (Bowie, Gabrels) – 3:12

CD version
 "Baby Universal" (7" version) (Bowie, Gabrels) – 3:07
 "Stateside" (BBC version) (Hunt Sales) – 6:35
 "If There Is Something" (BBC version) (Bryan Ferry) – 3:25
 "Heaven's in Here" (BBC version) (Bowie) – 6:41
 A "special edition" version of the CD single was released in a tin can container

Japan CD version
 "Baby Universal" (7" version) (Bowie, Gabrels) – 3:07
 "Amlapura" (Indonesian version) (Bowie, Gabrels) – 3:53
 "Shakin' All Over" (live) (Kidd) – 2:49
 "Baby Universal" (Extended version) (Bowie, Gabrels) – 5:49

US promo CD version
 "Baby Universal" (7" version) (Bowie, Gabrels) – 3:07
 "Baby Universal" (Extended version) (Bowie, Gabrels) – 5:49
 "Baby Universal" (BBC version) (Bowie, Gabrels) – 3:12
 "Stateside" (BBC version) (Sales) – 6:35

Live performances
"Baby Universal" was performed live by Tin Machine during their 1991-92 "It's My Life Tour," and by Bowie during his 1996 "Outside Summer Festivals Tour." A recording from the "It's My Life Tour" appears on the live video release of Tin Machine Live: Oy Vey, Baby (1992).

Credits and personnel
Producers
 Tin Machine
 Tim Palmer

Musicians
 David Bowie – vocals, guitar
 Reeves Gabrels – lead guitar
 Hunt Sales – drums, vocals
 Tony Sales – bass, vocals
 Kevin Armstrong – rhythm guitar

Chart performance

References

Pegg, Nicholas, The Complete David Bowie, Reynolds & Hearn Ltd, 2000, 

1991 singles
Tin Machine songs
1991 songs
Songs written by David Bowie
Songs written by Reeves Gabrels
London Records singles